Crooked Creek is a stream in western DeKalb County in the U.S. state of Missouri. It is a tributary of the Third Fork Platte River.

Crooked Creek most likely was named for its meandering course.

See also
List of rivers of Missouri

References

Rivers of DeKalb County, Missouri
Rivers of Missouri